Samokhvalovka is a rural locality (a village) in Ufa, Bashkortostan, Russia. The population was 39 as of 2010. There are 4 streets.

Geography 
Samokhvalovka is located 19 km southeast of Ufa. Fyodorovka is the nearest rural locality.

References 

Rural localities in Ufa urban okrug